Juhani Laakso (27 April 1942 – 1 June 2014) was a Finnish sports shooter. He competed in the 300 metre rifle event at the 1968 Summer Olympics.

References

External links
 

1942 births
2014 deaths
Finnish male sport shooters
Olympic shooters of Finland
Shooters at the 1968 Summer Olympics
People from Sysmä
Sportspeople from Päijät-Häme